Frank Hitchcock may refer to:

Frank Harris Hitchcock (1867–1935), American postmaster-general
Frank Lauren Hitchcock (1875–1957), American mathematician